Petr Kouba (born 28 January 1969 in Prague) is a Czech former professional football goalkeeper and current assistant coach for the Czech under-20 and under-21 national teams. He played for Czechoslovakia and later the Czech Republic, for both he played total 40 matches between 1991 and 1998.

Kouba, whose father Pavel Kouba was also a successful goalkeeper, began his playing career with Bohemians and Sparta Prague, where he scored a goal from a penalty kick in a national league match against SK České Budějovice in the 1994–95 season.

He was a participant in the UEFA Euro 1996, where the Czech Republic was runner-up.

References

External links
 

1969 births
Living people
Czech footballers
Footballers from Prague
Czech Republic international footballers
Czechoslovak footballers
Czechoslovakia international footballers
Dual internationalists (football)
Association football goalkeepers
Czech First League players
La Liga players
Deportivo de La Coruña players
UEFA Euro 1996 players
Bohemians 1905 players
AC Sparta Prague players
FK Viktoria Žižkov players
FK Jablonec players
1. FC Kaiserslautern players
Czech expatriate footballers
Expatriate footballers in Germany
Expatriate footballers in Spain
Czech expatriate sportspeople in Germany
Czech expatriate sportspeople in Spain